Laurencekirk railway station is a railway station serving the communities of Laurencekirk and The Mearns in Aberdeenshire, Scotland. The station was reopened on 18 May 2009 at a cost of £3 million. It is sited  from Carlisle, and is between Montrose and Stonehaven, on the Dundee to Aberdeen line. There is a crossover at the north end of the station, which can be used to facilitate trains turning back if the line south to Montrose is blocked.

History 
The station was opened on 1 November 1849 by the Aberdeen Railway, which ran from Aberdeen in the north to Guthrie (just outside Arbroath) to the south. The line joined the North British, Arbroath and Montrose Railway north of Montrose at Kinnaber Junction and Arbroath and Forfar Railway at the triangular junctions at Friockheim and Guthrie. The station was closed in September 1967 by British Railways.

Re-opening 

The residents of Laurencekirk, many of whom now commute to Aberdeen and Dyce had successfully campaigned for the station to be reopened – the official announcement being made during December 2006 that the station would open in December 2007, to be funded by Transport Scotland and the Regional Transport Partnership Nestrans. The announcement of December 2007 for the re-commencement of services to and from Laurencekirk was ultimately overly ambitious and it was announced in early 2008 that the station would be finished and ready for the December 2008 timetable change. However, in a New Release from Transport Scotland, the opening date was given at Spring 2009. The station was reopened by the Minister for Transport, Infrastructure & Climate Change, Stewart Stevenson on 18 May 2009.

The station building, which had fallen into poor overall condition was refurbished during Spring 2008, and a new car park with 70 parking spaces was built by Aberdeenshire Council and Nestrans, across the railway line from the station building, together with a small number of disabled parking spaces next to the station building. First ScotRail made provisional plans for 19 trains to serve the station each day, made up of 10 northbound services and 9 southbound services, with southbound services serving both Edinburgh and Glasgow. ScotRail will also be responsible for gritting and snow-clearing at the station.

Facilities 
Although the station is unstaffed, both platforms are equipped with shelters and benches. Platform 1 also has a help point and is adjacent to the car park, whilst platform 2 has a ticket machine. Both platforms have step-free access, and are connected by a footbridge, which also has a ramp.

Passenger volume 
On the first anniversary of the reopening of the station, it was revealed that almost double the expected number of passengers had used it – 64,000 people as opposed to a projection of 36,000. 

The statistics cover twelve month periods that start in April.

Services
As of the May 2022 timetable, Laurencekirk is served by an hourly stopping service which runs between Montrose and Inverurie. Some services also extend to Perth or Glasgow Queen Street westbound, and Inverness eastbound (although some terminate short at Aberdeen or Dyce). A limited service operates on Sundays, northbound to Aberdeen and southbound to Glasgow Queen Street, Edinburgh Waverley and Perth.

References

Bibliography

External Links 

 Video footage of the station on YouTube

Railway stations in Aberdeenshire
Former Caledonian Railway stations
Railway stations in Great Britain opened in 1849
Railway stations in Great Britain closed in 1967
Railway stations in Great Britain opened in 2009
Reopened railway stations in Great Britain
Railway stations served by ScotRail
Beeching closures in Scotland
1849 establishments in Scotland
Listed railway stations in Scotland
Category B listed buildings in Aberdeen
Laurencekirk